The Suippe is an  long river in Marne and Aisne départements, in north-eastern France. Its source is at Somme-Suippe. It flows generally northwest. It is a left tributary of the Aisne, into which it flows at Condé-sur-Suippe.

Départements and communes it runs through 
(ordered from source to mouth)
Marne: Somme-Suippe, Suippes, Jonchery-sur-Suippe, Saint-Hilaire-le-Grand, Aubérive, Vaudesincourt, Dontrien, Saint-Martin-l'Heureux, Saint-Hilaire-le-Petit, Bétheniville, Pontfaverger-Moronvilliers, Selles, Saint-Masmes, Heutrégiville, Warmeriville, Isles-sur-Suippe, Bazancourt, Boult-sur-Suippe, Saint-Étienne-sur-Suippe, Bourgogne, Auménancourt.
Aisne: Orainville, Bertricourt, Variscourt, Aguilcourt, Condé-sur-Suippe.

References

Rivers of France
Rivers of Grand Est
Rivers of Hauts-de-France
Rivers of Aisne
Rivers of Marne (department)